Narkoola National Park is a national park at Bollon in the Shire of Balonne of South West Queensland, Australia. It was established on 26 March 2010 to conserve significant species and diverse plant communities.

See also

 Protected areas of Queensland

References

National parks of Queensland
Protected areas established in 2010
2010 establishments in Australia
Shire of Balonne